Hapoel Umm al-Fahm Football Club is an Israeli football club based in Umm al-Fahm. The club currently plays in the Liga Leumit.

History
Established in 1963, at the start of the 1990s the club was playing in Liga Alef. At the end of the 1998–99 season they were relegated to Liga Bet North B. In 2005 they returned to Liga Alef.

After finishing as runners-up in Liga Alef North in 2006–07 under the management of Samir Issah, the following season the club won Liga Alef North and were promoted to Liga Artzit (then the third division). In the 2008–09 season they were relegated to Liga Alef and folded. However, four years later, in 2013, the club returned after Ahva Umm al-Fahm, which was founded two years earlier and promoted to Liga Bet in their first season, was renamed to Hapoel Umm al-Fahm.

Current squad
 As to 25 January 2023

Honours

League

External links
Hapoel Umm al-Fahm Israel Football Association 
Hapoel Umm al-Fahm (2009) Israel Football Association

References

Umm al-Fahm
Umm al-Fahm
Association football clubs established in 1963
1963 establishments in Israel
2009 disestablishments in Israel
Sport in Umm al-Fahm
Arab-Israeli football clubs